This is a list of New Zealand places named by James Cook. Cook was the first European navigator to circumnavigate and chart the archipelago. He chose names from dull to droll to descriptive, from metaphorical to a narrative of events, or to honour people and to record the existing Māori language names of places. The list below is in the order described in Cook's journals of his first and second voyages to the Pacific.

First voyage 

The first voyage was in New Zealand waters during late 1769 and early 1770.

Second Voyage 

In the autumn of 1773, Cook and the crew of Resolution recuperated in Dusky Sound / Tamatea, after 122 days at sea in the Pacific and Southern Ocean.

See also
List of Australian places named by James Cook

Notes

References 

James Cook
Named By James Cook